The Under Secretary for Civilian Security, Democracy, and Human Rights is a position within the U.S. Department of State that leads the State Department's efforts to prevent and counter threats to civilian security. The Under Secretary oversees the Bureau of Counterterrorism, the Bureau of Democracy, Human Rights, and Labor, the Bureau of Conflict and Stabilization Operations, the Bureau of International Narcotics and Law Enforcement Affairs, the Bureau of Population, Refugees, and Migration, the Office of Global Criminal Justice, and the Office to Monitor and Combat Trafficking in Persons.

Previously known as the Under Secretary for Democracy and Global Affairs, the position was renamed in 2012, during the Obama administration.

List of Under Secretaries of State for Civilian Security, Democracy, and Human Rights

References

 
Counterterrorism in the United States
2012 establishments in Washington, D.C.